Bath is an unincorporated community in Richmond County, in the U.S. state of Georgia.

History
The community was so named on account of a mineral spa near the original town site. An early variant name was "Richmond Baths". A post office called Bath was established in 1854, and remained in operation until 1907. In 1900, the community had 100 inhabitants.

References

Unincorporated communities in Richmond County, Georgia
Unincorporated communities in Georgia (U.S. state)